Karlos Ferrer Mojica (born January 28, 1998) is a Puerto Rican soccer player currently playing for Liga Puerto Rico club Metropolitan FA and the Puerto Rico national team.

Career

Youth career
In 2011, Karlos Ferrer played for the CD Barbosa youth team, and in the 2011 season he was chosen as MVP.

Club career
On July 28, 2016, Ferrer was one of five youths practicing football to have been awarded the first Lyon Scholarship for sporting and academic excellence. Ferrer excelled with the Metropolitan FA during the past season of the Puerto Rico Soccer League.

Ferrer became the all-time top scorer in the Puerto Rico Soccer League (PRSL) with 29 goals scored in a single season with the Metropolitan FA.

On January 19, 2017, Ferrer was selected as Player of the Year by FutbolBoricua at their 4th annual FBNET Awards.

International career
On June 11, 2013, Ferrer was chosen to participate in the CONCACAF tournament in the Cayman Islands with the Puerto Rico U-15 soccer team.

Ferrer's latest national senior team call-up was when he made an appearance against India on September 3, 2016.

Honors

Club
Metropolitan FA
Puerto Rico Soccer League: 2016

Individual
Puerto Rico Soccer League
FBNET Player of the Year: 2016

References

External links
 

1998 births
Living people
Puerto Rican footballers
Puerto Rico international footballers
Association football midfielders
Sportspeople from San Juan, Puerto Rico